Benjamin Alire Sáenz (born August 16, 1954) is an American poet, novelist, and writer of children's books.

Early life and education
Sáenz was raised near Las Cruces, New Mexico. He earned a BA in Humanities and Philosophy from St. Thomas Seminary in Denver, Colorado and a MA in creative writing from the University of Texas at El Paso. He continues to live and work in El Paso, Texas. After 15 years of marriage to his wife, an El Paso family court judge, he came out as gay, and they filed for divorce in 2009.

Sáenz was 54 when he came out. In an interview, he confirmed that he had struggled with this topic for a long time and that he saw writing as a way to overcome it.

In 2013, Benjamin Alire Sáenz became the first Latino to win the prestigious PEN/Faulkner Book Award for Fiction with Everything Begins and Ends at the Kentucky Club.

On October 29, 2022, Sáenz received the Inaugural Hummingbird Award in Literary Arts from the Tulsa City-County Library. The event was hosted by the Tulsa City-County Library and the Hispanic Resource Center.

Awards
 Wallace E. Stegner Fellowship, poetry
 1992 American Book Award, for Calendar of Dust
 Lannan Poetry Fellowship 1993
 Carry Me Like Water, Southwest Book Award 1996 (Border Regional Library Association)
 Dark and Perfect Angels, Southwest Book Award 1996 (Border Regional Library Association)
 Grandma Fina and Her Wonderful Umbrellas, Best Children's Book 2000, Texas Institute of Letters
 Sammy and Juliana in Hollywood, Americas Book Award, the Paterson Book Prize, the J Hunt Award, Finalist Los Angeles Book Prize, BBYA Top Ten Books for Young Adults
 He Forgot to Say Goodbye. Tomás Rivera Mexican American Children's Book Award, Southwest Book Award (Border Regional Library Association), Chicago Public Library, Best of the Best Books for Teens, New York Public Library Stuff for the Teen 2009, Commended Title, Americas Book Award 2009
 A Perfect Season for Dreaming, Best Children's Book, Friends of the Austin Public Library 2008 (Texas Institute of Letters), Bank Street Best Children's Books of the Year 2008, Kirkus Review 2008 Notable Books for Children, Paterson Book Prize
 Aristotle and Dante Discover the Secrets of the Universe, Stonewall Book Award; Mike Morgan & Larry Romans Children's and Young Adult Literature Award, 2013;  Honor Book, Michael L. Printz Award, 2013;  Pura Belpré Award, 2013.

Works
"Students I See Every Day", Santa Fe Poetry Broadside, Issue #31, February, 2003
Do Not Mind the Bombs, Narrative Magazine

Poetry

Short stories

Novels
 Carry Me Like Water, Hyperion, 1995
 
 
En el tiempo de la Luz, Rayo/HarperCollins 2006

Young-adult novels
 
 
 Last Night I Sang to the Monster, Cinco Puntos Press 2009
 Aristotle and Dante Discover the Secrets of the Universe, Simon & Schuster Books for Young Readers, 2012
 The Inexplicable Logic of My Life, Clarion Books, 2017
 Aristotle and Dante Dive into the Waters of the World, Simon & Schuster Books for Young Readers, 2021

Children's books
 
 
 A Perfect Season for Dreaming, Cinco Puntos Press 2008.
 The Dog Who Loved Tortillas, Cinco Puntos Press 2009

Anthologies

 
 "To the Desert," "Resurrections," Twentieth Century American Poetry (2004), edited by Dana Gioia, McGraw Hill

References

External links

Benjamin Alire Sáenz official page at Simon & Schuster, Inc.
Benjamin Alire Sáenz  official page at Cinco Puntos Press
 

1954 births
Living people
20th-century American novelists
20th-century American poets
20th-century American short story writers
21st-century American novelists
21st-century American poets
21st-century American short story writers
American children's writers
American writers of young adult literature
American male novelists
American male poets
American male short story writers
American writers of Mexican descent
American gay writers
Hispanic and Latino American novelists
Hispanic and Latino American poets
Lambda Literary Award for Children's and Young Adult Literature winners
Lambda Literary Award for Gay Fiction winners
Stonewall Book Award winners
LGBT Hispanic and Latino American people
American LGBT novelists
American LGBT poets
LGBT people from New Mexico
PEN/Faulkner Award for Fiction winners
People from Doña Ana County, New Mexico
Poets from Texas
Poets from New Mexico
Stanford University alumni
University of Iowa alumni
University of Texas at El Paso alumni
University of Texas at El Paso faculty
Writers from New Mexico
Novelists from Texas
American Book Award winners
20th-century American male writers
21st-century American male writers
21st-century LGBT people
Gay poets